

Career

Moses Somoine Ole Sakuda is a Kenyan politician who was elected Member of Parliament for Kajiado North Constituency on a TNA ticket in a by-election in September 2012.In 2013 he was elected As the first Member of Parliament for Kajiado West Constituency  He had contested the seat, against former incumbent George Saitoti, running for ODM in the 2007 Kenyan general election.

Education 
He has a master's degree in Educational Leadership and Divinity and previously served as Director of Programmes and Projects in the Ministry of Energy . On 12/12/12 President Kibaki Appointed him to his Cabinet as an Assistant Minister for Regional Development.

References

Kenyan politicians
Living people
Year of birth missing (living people)
Place of birth missing (living people)